Mickey is a 1948 American coming-of-age comedy drama film directed by Ralph Murphy and starring Lois Butler, Bill Goodwin, Skip Homeier and Academy Award-winning actress Hattie McDaniel. The film was based on the novel Clementine by Peggy Goodin and was filmed in Cinecolor. The film's sets were designed by the art director Edward L. Ilou.

Plot
The plotline involves a young tomboy named Mickey (Butler) with a beautiful singing voice, who is torn between singing and playing on her baseball team. Meanwhile, Mickey is trying to make her widowed father fall in love with her neighbor's aunt, Louise (Hervey), a woman who is helping Mickey try to be more ladylike so she can become her best friend's love interest.

Cast

External links

1948 films
Films based on American novels
American independent films
American coming-of-age drama films
Eagle-Lion Films films
1948 drama films
Films directed by Ralph Murphy
Cinecolor films
1940s coming-of-age drama films
1940s independent films
1940s English-language films
1940s American films